In economics, a unit demand agent is an agent who wants to buy a single item, which may be of one of different types. A typical example is a buyer who needs a new car. There are many different types of cars, but usually a buyer will choose only one of them, based on the quality and the price.

If there are m different item-types, then a unit-demand valuation function is typically represented by m values , with  representing the subjective value that the agent derives from item . If the agent receives a set  of items, then his total utility is given by:

Ordinal and cardinal definitions 
A unit-demand valuation is formally defined by:
 For a preference relation: for every set  there is a subset  with cardinality , such that .
 For a utility function:  For every set :

Connection to other classes of utility functions 
A unit-demand function is an extreme case of a submodular set function.

It is characteristic of items that are pure substitute goods.

See also 
 Utility functions on indivisible goods
 Matching (graph theory)

References 

Utility function types